The following is a list of the Dead Sea Scrolls from the caves near Qumran. The Dead Sea Scrolls is a collection of manuscripts discovered between 1946 and 1956 in the West Bank near the Dead Sea.

List of manuscripts

Information is not always comprehensive, as content for many scrolls has not yet been fully published. Some resources for more complete information on the scrolls are the book by Emanuel Tov, "Revised Lists of the Texts from the Judaean Desert" for a complete list of all of the Dead Sea Scroll texts, as well as the online webpages for the Shrine of the Book and the Leon Levy Collection, both of which present photographs and images of the scrolls and fragments themselves for closer study.

Qumran Cave 1

Qumran Cave 2

Qumran Cave 3

Qumran Cave 4

Qumran Cave 5

Qumran Cave 6

Qumran Cave 7

Qumran Cave 8

Qumran Cave 9

Qumran Cave 10

Qumran Cave 11

Wadi Murabba'at Cave 1

Nahal Hever Cave 8

Masada

See also 
 Biblical manuscripts
 Septuagint manuscripts
 List of Hebrew Bible manuscripts

Notes

References

External links
 Dead Sea Scrolls by Paul Conway
 A Catalog of Biblical Passages in the Dead Sea Scrolls by David Washburn, 2002
 Textual Criticism: Recovering the Text of the Hebrew Bible by Peter Kyle McCarter, 1986

 
Dead Sea Scrolls
State of Palestine religion-related lists